Roddy Doyle (born 8 May 1958) is an Irish novelist, dramatist and screenwriter. He is the author of eleven novels for adults, eight books for children, seven plays and screenplays, and dozens of short stories. Several of his books have been made into films, beginning with The Commitments in 1991. Doyle's work is set primarily in Ireland, especially working-class Dublin, and is notable for its heavy use of dialogue written in slang and Irish English dialect. Doyle was awarded the Booker Prize in 1993 for his novel Paddy Clarke Ha Ha Ha.

Personal life
Doyle was born in Dublin and grew up in Kilbarrack, in a middle-class family. His mother, Ita Bolger Doyle, was a first cousin of the short story writer Maeve Brennan. 

In addition to teaching, Doyle, along with Seán Love, established a creative writing centre, "Fighting Words", which opened in Dublin in January 2009. It was inspired by a visit to his friend Dave Eggers' 826 Valencia project in San Francisco. He has also engaged in local causes, including signing a petition supporting journalist Suzanne Breen, who faced gaol for refusing to divulge her sources in court, and joining a protest against an attempt by Dublin City Council to construct 9 ft-high barriers which would interfere with one of his favourite views.

In 1987 Doyle married Belinda Moller, granddaughter of former Irish President Erskine Childers. They have three children; Rory, Jack and Kate.

Doyle is an atheist.

Education 
Doyle attended University College Dublin, where he studied English and geography, and graduated with a BA in 1979. He went on to complete a Higher Diploma in Education (HDipEd) in 1980. He spent several years as an English and geography teacher before becoming a full-time writer in 1993.

Work
Doyle's writing is marked by heavy use of dialogue between characters, with little description or exposition. His work is largely set in Ireland, with a focus on the lives of working-class Dubliners. Themes range from domestic and personal concerns to larger questions of Irish history. His personal notes and work books reside at the National Library of Ireland.

Novels for adults

Doyle's first three novels, The Commitments (1987), The Snapper (1990) and  The Van (1991) compose The Barrytown Trilogy, a trilogy centred on the Rabbitte family. All three novels were made into successful films.

The Commitments is about a group of Dublin teenagers, led by Jimmy Rabbitte Jr., who decide to form a soul band in the tradition of Wilson Pickett. The novel was made into a film in 1991. The Snapper, made into a film in 1993, focuses on Jimmy's sister, Sharon, who becomes pregnant. She is determined to have the child but refuses to reveal the father's identity to her family. In The Van, which was shortlisted for the 1991 Booker Prize and made into a film in 1996, Jimmy Sr. is laid off, as is his friend Bimbo; the two buy a used fish and chips van and they go into business for themselves.

In 1993, Doyle published Paddy Clarke Ha Ha Ha, winner of the 1993 Booker Prize, which showed the world as described, understood and misunderstood by a ten-year-old Dubliner living in 1968.

Doyle's next novel dealt with darker themes. The Woman Who Walked into Doors, published in 1996, is the story of a battered wife, Paula Spencer, who was introduced in his 1994 television series Family, and is narrated by her. Despite her husband's increasingly violent behaviour, Paula defends him, using the classic excuse "I walked into a door" to explain her bruises. Ten years later, the protagonist returned in Paula Spencer, published in 2006.

Doyle's most recent trilogy of adult novels is The Last Roundup series, which follows the adventures of protagonist Henry Smart through several decades. A Star Called Henry (published 1999) is the first book in the series, and tells the story of Henry Smart, an IRA volunteer and 1916 Easter Rebellion fighter, from his birth in Dublin to his adulthood when he becomes a father. Oh, Play That Thing! (2004) continues Henry's story in 1924 America, beginning in the Lower East Side of New York City, where he catches the attention of local mobsters by hiring kids to carry his sandwich boards. He also goes to Chicago where he becomes a business partner with Louis Armstrong. The title is taken from a phrase that is shouted in one of Armstrong's songs, "Dippermouth Blues". In the final novel in the trilogy, The Dead Republic (published 2010), Henry collaborates on writing the script for a Hollywood film. He returns to Ireland and is offered work as the caretaker in a school, when circumstances lead to him re-establishing his link with the IRA.

Doyle frequently posts short comic dialogues on his Facebook page which are implied to be between two older men in a pub, often relating to current events in Ireland (such as the 2015 marriage referendum) and further afield. These developed into the novella Two Pints (2012). Other recent works are The Guts (2013), which continues the story of the Rabbitte family from the Barrytown Trilogy, focusing on a 48-year-old Jimmy Rabbite and his diagnosis of bowel cancer and Two More Pints (2014).

Novels for children

Doyle has also written many novels for children, including the "Rover Adventures" series, which includes The Giggler Treatment (2000), Rover Saves Christmas (2001), and The Meanwhile Adventures (2004).

Other children's books include Wilderness (2007), Her Mother's Face (2008), and A Greyhound of a Girl (2011).

Plays, screenplays, short stories and non-fiction

Doyle is also a prolific dramatist, composing four plays and two screenplays. His plays with the Passion Machine Theatre company include Brownbread (1987) and War (1989), directed by Paul Mercier with set and costume design by Anne Gately. Later plays include The Woman Who Walked into Doors (2003); and a rewrite of The Playboy of the Western World (2007) with Bisi Adigun. This latter play was the subject of litigation about copyright which ended with the Abbey Theatre agreeing to pay Adigun €600,000.

Screenplays include the television screenplay for Family (1994), which was a BBC/RTÉ serial and the forerunner of the 1996 novel The Woman Who Walked into Doors. Doyle also authored When Brendan Met Trudy (2000), which is a romance about a timid schoolteacher (Brendan) and a free-spirited thief (Trudy).

Doyle has written many short stories, several of which have been published in The New Yorker; they have also been compiled in two collections. The Deportees and Other Stories was published in 2007, while the collection Bullfighting was published in 2011. Doyle's story "New Boy" was adapted into a 2008 Academy Award-nominated short film directed by Steph Green.

Rory and Ita (2002) is a work of non-fiction about Doyle's parents, based on interviews with them.

The Commitments was adapted by Doyle for a musical which began in the West End in 2013.

Two Pints (2017) was produced by the Abbey Theatre initially in pubs and later in the theatre itself.

In 2018 the Gate Theatre commissioned Doyle to write a stage adaptation of The Snapper. The show was directed by Róisín McBrinn and was revived in 2019.

Awards and honours
 Royal Society of Literature Fellow
 1991 Booker Prize shortlist for The Van
 1991 BAFTA Award (Best Adapted Screenplay) for The Commitments
 1993 Booker Prize for Paddy Clarke Ha Ha Ha
 2009 Irish PEN Award
 2011 French Literary Award ("Prix Littéraire des Jeunes Européens") for The Snapper
 2013 Bord Gáis Energy Irish Book Awards (Novel of the Year) for The Guts
 2015 Honorary Doctor of Laws (LLD) from University of Dundee
 2021 Dalkey Literary Awards, Shortlist

In popular culture
In the television series Father Ted, the character Father Dougal Maguire's unusual sudden use of (mild) profanities (such as saying "I wouldn't know, Ted, you big bollocks!") is blamed on his having "been reading those Roddy Doyle books again."

Bibliography

Novels
 Smile (2017)
 Charlie Savage (2019)
 Love (2020)

The Barrytown Pentalogy
 The Commitments (1987, 1991 film)
 The Snapper (1990, 1993 film)
 The Van (1991) ; 1996 film)
 Paddy Clarke Ha Ha Ha (1993)
 The Guts (2013)
Paula Spencer novels
 The Woman Who Walked into Doors (1996)
 Paula Spencer (2006)
The Last Roundup
 A Star Called Henry (1999)
 Oh, Play That Thing! (2004)
 The Dead Republic (2010)

Short fiction 
Collections
The Deportees and Other Stories, September 2007.
Bullfighting, April 2011.
Life Without Children: Stories (2021)
Stories

 "The Slave" (2000)
 "Teaching"  (2007)
 "The Dog" (2007)
 "Bullfighting" (2008)
 "The Child" (2004)
 "Sleep" (2008).
 "The Bandstand" (2009)
 "Brilliant" (2011)

 Not Just for Christmas (1999) (part of the Open Door Series of novellas for adult literacy)
 Mad Weekend (2006) (part of the Open Door Series)
 Two Pints (2012)
 Two More Pints (2014)
 Two for the Road (2019)
 Dead Man Talking (2015) (part of the Quick Reads Initiative)

Plays
 Brownbread (1987)
 War (1989)
 Guess Who's Coming for the Dinner? (2001)
 The Woman Who Walked into Doors (2003)
 Rewrite of The Playboy of the Western World (2007) with Bisi Adigun
Two Pints (2017)
The Snapper (2018)

Screenplays
 The Commitments (1991)
 The Snapper (1993)
 Family (1994)
 The Van (1996)
 When Brendan Met Trudy (2000)
 New Boy (2008)
 Rosie (2018)

Children's books
 Wilderness (2007)
 Her Mother's Face (2008)
 A Greyhound of a Girl (2011)BrilliantThe "Rover Adventures" series
 The Giggler Treatment (2000)
 Rover Saves Christmas (2001)
 The  Adventures (2004)
 Rover and the Big Fat Baby (2016)

Non-fiction
 Rory and Ita (2002) – about Doyle's parents
 The Second Half (2014) – memoirs of Roy Keane

References

Further reading

 "Roddy Doyle." Contemporary Authors Online. Detroit: Gale, 2012. 
 Abel, Marco. "Roddy Doyle." British Novelists Since 1960: Second Series. Ed. Merritt Moseley. Detroit: Gale Research, 1998. Dictionary of Literary Biography Vol. 194. 
 Allen Randolph, Jody. "Roddy Doyle, August 2009." Close to the Next Moment: Interviews from a Changing Ireland. Manchester: Carcanet, 2010.
 Boland, Eavan. "Roddy Doyle." Irish Writers on Writing. San Antonio: Trinity University Press, 2007.
 McArdle, Niall. An Indecency Decently Put: Roddy Doyle and Contemporary Irish Fiction. (M.A. thesis, 1994, University College, Dublin)
 McCarthy, Dermot. Roddy Doyle: Raining on the Parade. Dublin: Liffey Press, 2003.
 Mouchel-Vallon, Alain. La réécriture de l'histoire dans les Romans de Roddy Doyle, Dermot Bolger et Patrick McCabe  (PhD thesis, 2005, Reims University, France). 
 Reynolds, Margaret, and Jonathan Noakes. Roddy Doyle: The Essential Guide. London: Random House, 2004.
 White, Caramine. Reading Roddy Doyle. Syracuse: Syracuse UP, 2001.

External links
 General
 Doyle's website
 Fighting Words Writing Centre
 
 Works by Doyle
 Archive of Doyle's short fiction for The New Yorker''.
"The Photograph" (16 October 2006)
"The Joke" (29 November 2004)
 Roddy Doyle's rules for writers
 Roddy Doyle's verdict on James Joyce's Ulysses
 Interviews and reviews
 Author page at Irish Writers Online
 Roddy Doyle: Author Biography, Postcolonial Studies at Emory
 The Salon Interview: Roddy Doyle
 Roddy Doyle at Fantastic Fiction
 Reviews of Paula Spencer (2006)
 
 

1958 births
Writers from Dublin (city)
Kilbarrack
St Fintan's High School
Alumni of University College Dublin
Irish atheists
Irish male novelists
Irish male dramatists and playwrights
Irish male short story writers
Irish children's writers
20th-century Irish male writers
20th-century Irish novelists
20th-century Irish short story writers
21st-century Irish male writers
21st-century Irish novelists
21st-century Irish short story writers
The New Yorker people
Fellows of the Royal Society of Literature
Irish PEN Award for Literature winners
Booker Prize winners
Best Adapted Screenplay BAFTA Award winners
Living people
People educated at St. Fintan's High School